White Christmas Blue is the forty-fourth solo studio album and second Christmas album by American country music singer-songwriter Loretta Lynn. It was released on October 7, 2016, by Sony Legacy. The album is produced by Lynn's daughter, Patsy Lynn Russell, and John Carter Cash, the son of Johnny Cash and June Carter Cash.

Background
White Christmas Blue is Lynn’s first Christmas album in five decades, since her 1966 album Country Christmas. The album is the second in a planned series of five albums, following 2016’s Full Circle, from what is being called the "Cash Cabin Recordings", an extensive library of new music, overseen by producers Patsy Lynn Russell and John Carter Cash, that has been Lynn’s primary artistic focus in recent years. Six tracks on the album - "Country Christmas", "Away in a Manger", "Blue Christmas", "To Heck with Ole Santa Claus", "Frosty the Snowman" and "White Christmas" - were previously recorded by Lynn for her first Christmas album, Country Christmas.

Critical reception
White Christmas Blue was met with generally favorable critical reception. Giving the album 7 out of 10 stars, John Paul of Pop Matters said, “There’s a warmth and intimacy to Lynn’s performances of these Christmas standards. By elegantly tapping into each, Lynn…provides fans with a collection that can be returned to time and again with the same heart-warming familiarity of faded photographs and video images of Christmases past.” American Songwriters''' Hal Horowitz gave the album 3.5 out of 5 stars saying that “Lynn, now in her mid-80s, is also in remarkably spry voice. You never feel she’s going through the motions, even on the most overdone classics.” Walter Tunis, writing for the Lexington Herald Ledger gave a positive review, saying that “Few artists can draw upon an esteemed artistic heritage to such as unassuming degree as Loretta Lynn does on the title track to her new White Christmas Blue'' album."

Commercial performance
The album debuted at No. 35 on the Billboard Top Country Albums chart, selling 1,800 copies in its first week. The album reached its peak position of No. 26 on the Billboard Top Country Albums chart dated December 24, 2016, selling 4,200 copies. As of September 2017, the album has sold 29,400 copies.

Track listing

Personnel
 Ronnie Bowman - backing vocals 
 Mike Bub - upright bass
 Shawn Camp - acoustic guitar, backing vocals 
 Matt Combs - fiddle, mandolin 
 Dennis Crouch - upright bass
 Paul Franklin - steel guitar
 Tony Harrell - fiddle, piano 
 Jamie Hartford - baritone guitar, electric guitar, mandolin 
 Doug Jernigan - steel guitar 
 Rick Lonow - drums
 Suzi Ragsdale - backing vocals
 John Randall - backing vocals
 Chris Scruggs - acoustic guitar
 Randy Scruggs - acoustic guitar
 Bryan Sutton - acoustic guitar
 Laura Weber - fiddle, acoustic guitar 
 Mark Winchester - bass

Charts

References

External links
White Christmas Blue - Loretta Lynn - AllMusic

2016 albums
Loretta Lynn albums
Legacy Recordings albums
Appalachian music
Albums produced by John Carter Cash